is a village in Aso District, Kumamoto Prefecture, Japan.

It was formed on February 13, 2005 from the merger of the villages of Chōyō, Hakusui and Kugino. Neighbouring towns are Takamori, Ōzu, and Nishihara.

As of April 30, 2019, the village has an estimated population of 10,535 and a population density of 77 persons per km². The total area is 137.30 km².

Geography

Climate
Minamiaso has a humid subtropical climate (Köppen climate classification Cfa) with hot summers and cool winters. Precipitation is high, but there is a pronounced difference between the wetter summers and drier winters.

Demographics
Per Japanese census data, the population of Minamiaso in 2020 is 9,836 people. Minamiaso has been conducting censuses since 1960.

History
Minamiaso is situated within Aso Caldera, one of the largest volcanic calderas in the world. For more information, refer to the entry on Mt. Aso.

Minamiaso was once three separate villages: Chōyō, Hakusui and Kugino. In 2005, it was decided that these villages would merge along with neighboring area Tateno to become Minamiaso village, which would stretch between Ōzu and Takamori.

Merger 
Due to declining birth rate, aging population and the opportunity to share administrative resources, discussions between the three villages (Chōyō, Hakusui and Kugino) began on April 1, 2003. The merger was complete on February 13, 2005.

Education 
 Tokai Agricultural University
 Kumamoto Seiryou High School

There are no public high schools in Minamiaso.

Junior high schools
 Chōyō Junior High School
 Hakusui Junior High School
 Kugino Junior High School

Junior High School Merger

At the beginning of 2016, due to declining student numbers, the three junior high schools merged into a single school, named simply "Minamiaso Junior High School". Chōyō Junior High School was chosen as the new location to host the students and staff.

Elementary schools

 Tateno Elementary School
 Chōyō Elementary School
 West Chōyō Elementary School
 Nakamatsu Elementary School
 Hakusui Elementary School
 Ryouhei Elementary School
 Kugino Elementary School

Transportation

Rail
Trains going to Ōzu, Miyaji (Aso City) or non-express trains bound for Oita will stop at Tateno Station. Those trains bound for Ōzu will end their journey there and connecting train will be waiting at the adjacent platform. A change will also need to be made at Tateno to the Minamiaso Tetsudou line, which is not a JR line so JR Rail Passes will not be valid. From Tateno to Chōyō (the first station in Minamiaso-mura) costs 230 yen. Following the 2016 Kumamoto earthquake, the train line is not in operation and is currently receiving repairs (as of 27 January 2017).

References

External links

  
AsoFan.net
Mt Torokko (Minamiaso Railway) 
Minamiaso-mura Association of Tourism

Villages in Kumamoto Prefecture